The White Swan is a Grade II listed public house at 14 New Row, Covent Garden, London, WC2.

It was built in the late 17th or early 18th century, refaced and altered mid-19th century. It was an O'Neill's pub, but has now reverted to its original name and is run by Nicholsons.

References

Covent Garden
Grade II listed pubs in the City of Westminster